Sassine is the surname of the following people:
Michel Georges Sassine (1927–2014), Lebanese politician
Nicole Sassine (born 1989), Canadian sprinter 
Sandra Sassine (born 1979), Canadian fencer
Williams Sassine (1944–1997), Guinean novelist

See also
Sassine Square in Beirut, Lebanon